Caenopedina capensis is a species of sea urchins of the Family Pedinidae. Their armour is covered with spines. Caenopedina capensis was first scientifically described in 1923 by Hubert Lyman Clark.

References

Animals described in 1923
Pedinoida
Taxa named by Hubert Lyman Clark